The men's 100 metres event at the 1991 Summer Universiade was held at the Don Valley Stadium in Sheffield on 20 and 21 July 1991.

Medalists

Results

Heats
Wind:Heat 1: +1.2 m/s, Heat 2: +1.4 m/s, Heat 3: +1.8 m/s, Heat 4: +2.0 m/s, Heat 5: +2.3 m/s, Heat 6: +2.9 m/s, Heat 7: +2.4 m/s, Heat 8: +2.6 m/s, Heat 9: +0.5 m/s

Quarterfinals
Wind:Heat 1: +2.6 m/s, Heat 2: +1.7 m/s, Heat 3: +3.9 m/s, Heat 4: +1.6 m/s

Semifinals
Wind:Heat 1: +1.0 m/s, Heat 2: +0.8 m/s

Final

Wind: 0.0 m/s

References

Athletics at the 1991 Summer Universiade
1991